Snyder County is  a county in the Commonwealth of Pennsylvania. As of the 2020 census, the population was 39,736. The county seat is Middleburg. Snyder County was formed in 1855 from parts of Union County.

Snyder County comprises the Selinsgrove, PA Micropolitan Statistical Area, which is also included in the Bloomsburg-Berwick-Sunbury, PA Combined Statistical Area.

History
Snyder County was settled in the 1740s by Pennsylvania Germans from Berks and Lancaster counties, and became an independent political unit on March 2, 1855, when formed under part of Union County.  Snyder County took its name in honor of the famous citizen and political figure Simon Snyder, who was governor of Pennsylvania for three terms, from 1808 to 1817, and made his home in Selinsgrove. The county seat of Middleburg was laid out in 1800 and incorporated in 1864.

Geography
It is the fifth-smallest county in Pennsylvania by area. Snyder County is in the Ridge and Valley region of the Appalachian Mountains. Two parallel mountain ridges, Shade Mountain and Jacks Mountain, run southwest to northeast. The Susquehanna River is the eastern border. Between the ridges are steep hills, gently rolling hills, and flat creek valleys. With over 400 active farms in the county, agriculture plays an important role in the economy and environment. Roughly half the county remains forested with both softwoods and hardwoods. These woods provide a place for wildlife to roam which provides for the sport of hunting.

Climate
Snyder has a humid continental climate,  which is hot-summer (Dfa) except in higher elevations, where it is warm-summer (Dfb). Average temperatures in Selinsgrove range from 27.4 °F in January to 72.8 °F in July, while in Beavertown they range from 26.6 °F in January to 72.1 °F in July.

Adjacent counties
Union County (north)
Northumberland County (east)
Juniata County (south)
Mifflin County (west)

Demographics

According to the 2010 federal census, there were 39,702 people, 14,414 households, and 9,981 families residing in the county. The population density was 113 people per square mile (44/km2). There were 14,890 housing units at an average density of 45 per square mile (17/km2). The racial makeup of the county was 97% White, 1.2% Black or African American, 0.1% Native American, 0.42% Asian, and 0.07% Pacific Islander. Two percent of the population were Hispanic or Latino. US Veterans – 2,681. Median household income (in 2014 dollars), 2010–2014 was reported as $48,718, while the per capita income was $23,886. In 2014, the median household income in the USA was $53,700.

As of the census of 2000, there were 37,546 people, 13,654 households, and 9,981 families residing in the county. The population density was 113 people per square mile (44/km2). There were 14,890 housing units at an average density of 45 per square mile (17/km2). The racial makeup of the county was 97.93% White, 0.82% Black or African American, 0.05% Native American, 0.42% Asian, 0.01% Pacific Islander. 0.98% of the population were Hispanic or Latino of any race. 48.2% were of German, 17.2% American and 5.5% English ancestry.

There were 13,654 households, out of which 32.10% had children under the age of 18 living with them, 62.00% were married couples living together, 7.40% had a female householder with no husband present, and 26.90% were non-families. 22.40% of all households were made up of individuals, and 10.30% had someone living alone who was 65 years of age or older. The average household size was 2.58 and the average family size was 3.02.

In the county, the population was spread out, with 24.00% under the age of 18, 11.20% from 18 to 24, 27.40% from 25 to 44, 23.30% from 45 to 64, and 14.00% who were 65 years of age or older. The median age was 37 years. For every 100 females there were 95.60 males. For every 100 females age 18 and over, there were 93.10 males.

2020 Census

Micropolitan Statistical Area

The United States Office of Management and Budget has designated Snyder County as the Selinsgrove, PA Micropolitan Statistical Area (µSA). As of the 2010 census the micropolitan area ranked 15th most populous in the State of Pennsylvania and the 313th most populous in the United States with a population of 39,702. Snyder County is also a part of the Bloomsburg–Berwick–Sunbury, PA Combined Statistical Area (CSA), which combines the populations of Snyder County, as well as Columbia, Montour, Northumberland and Union Counties in Pennsylvania. The Combined Statistical Area ranked 8th in the State of Pennsylvania and 115th most populous in the United States with a population of 264,739.

Politics

|}

The county is strongly Republican in presidential elections. The last Republican nominee to receive less than 60% of the county’s vote was Bob Dole. In 2008 John McCain received 64% of the county’s vote. In the 1964 presidential election Snyder County was one of only four counties in Pennsylvania to vote for Barry Goldwater, and by 0.6 percentage points shaded Carroll County, New Hampshire as Goldwater’s strongest county in the Northeast. The last Republican presidential candidate to lose Snyder County was incumbent president William Howard Taft when he split the Republican vote with challenger and former president Theodore Roosevelt, who took the county for the insurgent Progressive Party. In fact, no Democratic presidential candidate has been able to claim the county since Pennsylvania native James Buchanan won the presidency in 1856. The only county in Pennsylvania to be more steadfastly Republican (or indeed, remain so one-sidedly partisan for either party in Pennsylvania) in presidential contests has been Snyder County's neighbor to the north, Union County, which voted for John C. Fremont over Buchanan in 1856.

The county is located in Pennsylvania's 12th congressional district, which has a Cook Partisan Voting Index of R+17 and is represented by Republican Fred Keller. As part of  Pennsylvania Senate, District 27 it is represented by Republican John Gordner. The county contains locations in Pennsylvania House of Representatives, District 82, Pennsylvania House of Representatives, District 85, and Pennsylvania House of Representatives, District 108. All of these have been represented by Republicans since 1989.

Of "Straight Party" voters in Snyder 73.2% are Republican and 24.65% are Democratic. In the 2008 election Republicans won in all races and in most they won by over 20%. Chris Carney lost by roughly 13% in the county while winning by 12% in the district.

State Representatives
Serve two-year terms in Pennsylvania House of Representatives

David H. Rowe, Republican, 85th District
Lynda Schlegel-Culver Republican, 108th District

State Senator
John Gordner, Republican, 27th district serves four-year term in Pennsylvania Senate.

US Representatives
Fred Keller, Republican, Pennsylvania's 12th congressional district, serves two-year terms in the US House of Representatives.

U.S. Senators
Serves six year terms in U.S. Senate
Pat Toomey, Republican
Bob Casey Jr., Democratic

Boards and agencies
Snyder County Conservation District The conservation district is governed by a seven-member board of volunteer directors.  The Conservation District is a delegated authority to administer in Snyder County the state Erosion and Sediment Pollution Control (ESPC) program under PA Code Title 25 Chapter 102 and Chapter 105 Rules and Regulations and the Clean Streams Law.  Act 217, the Conservation District law, permits conservation districts to charge fees for services, under certain circumstances.  Their motto is Conservation Through Education. They offer programs regarding nutrient management, erosion prevention, Improving Dirt & Gravel Roads, and Watershed Protection. SCCD location map.
Snyder County Cooperative Extension Board Snyder County Courthouse, Middleburg, PA. Through educational programs, publications, and events, cooperative extension agents deliver unbiased, research-based information to Snyder County citizens.
Snyder County Housing Authority's mission is to promote safe, sanitary, and affordable housing, and maintain a good quality of life for Snyder County residents. Provides rental assistance to low income county residents using a voucher system for renting suitable housing. The authority meets on the third Wednesday of each month in the conference room of its Administrative offices located at 106 Drake Court, Middleburg, PA 17842. Denise Miller is the Executive Director. Phone: 570-837-3979
Snyder County Emergency Services is the public-safety answering point (PSAP) for Snyder County. The office is located at 30 Universal Rd, Selinsgrove, PA 17870.
Columbia, Montour, Snyder and Union Joinder Board and Local Emergency Planning Committee
Snyder County Agricultural Land Preservation Board
Tourism Fund Review Panel for Snyder County
SEDA-Council of Governments Board of Directors
Central Pennsylvania Workforce Development Corp. board
Snyder County Prison Board
Snyder County Waste Management Authority  713 Bridge Street, Suite 9, Selinsgrove, Pa  17870 The Authority is charged with the planning of how to manage the solid waste in the County. A 8909  recycling program is available throughout the county with a varying schedule. Additionally, it is examining the issue of a single waste hauler contract for the county or to continue to allow individuals to contract privately with individual haulers.
Snyder County Amateur Radio Emergency Communications provide vital communication resources during a crisis or disaster. Efforts go through the County's Emergency Management Coordinator.

Utilities
Electric – All 21 municipalities within Snyder County receive electric service from PPL Electric Utilities, Inc.  According to the U.S. Department of Energy, a 500 kilovolt line runs through Snyder County. Three 138 kilovolt lines stem from this 500 kilovolt line at the Sunbury Generation coal-fired power plant in Shamokin Dam, which is capable of producing roughly 400 megawatts of electrical power.

Water – Water service in Snyder County is provided by various municipal and regional authorities, private water providers, and private well water sources.

Gas – UGI Penn Natural Gas is the only natural gas provider in Snyder County, providing service to Jackson,
Middlecreek, Monroe, and Penn Townships, as well as Selinsgrove and Shamokin Dam Boroughs. Several propane dealers
exist to service the rural community.

Communications – Verizon provides telephone service and EvenLink provides VoIP telephone
service to all 21 municipalities in Snyder County.

Cable television service is provided by Service Electric Cablevision, Nittany Media, Inc., and Beaver Springs Community TV Association.

High-speed Internet access is principally provided by Verizon, EvenLink, and Service Electric Cablevision.

There are several restaurants featuring high speed wireless internet in Snyder County.  Dunkin Donuts and Applebee's provide fee-based services provided by PenTeleData Unleashed.  The White House Deli in MP Mills provides a free service.

Economy
Manufacturing since the year 2001 was faced with the largest loss in employment in Snyder County. The sector dealt with a loss of 427 jobs, or 7.2 percent of the employment in the industry. This made up a total of 36 percent of all county employment losses since 2001. Employment Report for Snyder County, Pennsylvania. U.S. Department of Labor. Bureau of Labor Statistics.

Education

Colleges and universities
 Susquehanna University

Public school districts
 Midd-West School District
 Selinsgrove Area School District

Private schools
As reported by the National Center for Educational Statistics
Bannerville School, Mcclure, Grades 2-8
Chapman Parochial School, Port Trevorton, Grades 1-9
Gospel Christian Academy, Selinsgrove, Grades KG-11
Jacks Mountain School, Mcclure, Grades 1-8
Kantz Church School, Middleburg, Grades 1-8
Lakeview School, Port Trevorton, Grades 1-8
Leaning Oak School, Mount Pleasant Mills, Grades 1-9
Locust Grove School, Mount Pleasant Mills, Grades 1-8
Meadow View School, Trevorton, Grades 1-8
New Story School, Special education K-12, Selinsgrove Operates in the former Jackson-Penn Elementary School building on lease from SASD
Palace Creek School, Mount Pleasant Mills, Grades 1-8
Penn View Christian Academy,  Penns Creek, Grades PK-12
Shady Grove Parochial School, Port Trevorton, Grades 1-8
White Oak School Liverpool, Grades 1-8

Transportation
Snyder County has two main arteries. U.S. Routes 11/15 travel through the county on the east end generally following the path of the Susquehanna River. The proposed Central Susquehanna Valley Thruway travels through the county. U.S. Route 522 begins in Selinsgrove and travels west through Kreamer, Middleburg and on to Lewistown. Route 35 begins on U.S. 11/15 south of Selinsgrove and runs roughly parallel to Route 522, crossing through Freeburg and Mount Pleasant Mills then westward to McAllisterville and Richfield in western Snyder County. State routes 235, 104 and 204 cross the county in a north–south direction.

Communities

Under Pennsylvania law, there are four types of incorporated municipalities: cities, boroughs, townships, and, in at most two cases, towns. The following boroughs and townships are located in Snyder County:

Boroughs
Beavertown
Freeburg
McClure
Middleburg (county seat)
Selinsgrove
Shamokin Dam

Townships

Adams
Beaver
Center
Chapman
Franklin
Jackson
Middlecreek
Monroe
Penn
Perry
Spring
Union
Washington
West Beaver
West Perry

Census-designated places
Census-designated places are geographical areas designated by the U.S. Census Bureau for the purposes of compiling demographic data. They are not actual jurisdictions under Pennsylvania law. Other unincorporated communities, such as villages, may be listed here as well.

Beaver Springs
Hummels Wharf
Kissimmee (not a CDP)
Kratzerville
Kreamer
Mount Pleasant Mills
Paxtonville
Penns Creek
Port Trevorton
Richfield (partly in Juniata County)
Troxelville

Population ranking
The population ranking of the following table is based on the 2010 census of Snyder County.

† county seat

Culture
Snyder County is well known for its unmistakable Pennsylvania German language and culture, agricultural heritage, as well as its fraktur, Kentucky rifles, wood products industries, Middleswarth chip factory, and the annual fairs, festivals, and auctions that keep the local heritage alive. Some of the more famous historical structures of the county are the Governor Snyder Mansion, Pomfret's Castle, Schoch Block House, ruins of the Pennsylvania Canal, and its covered bridges. Snyder County is home to Snyder-Middleswarth State Park, the Tall Timbers Natural Area, and thirteen Pennsylvania state historical markers.

Historical markers
Pennsylvania Canal (Susquehanna Division) – US 11 & 15 at Port Trevorton
Simon Snyder – SR 2017 (old US 11 & 15) just S of Selinsgrove
Simon Snyder Mansion (Plaque) – 121 N. Market St. (old US 11 & 15), Selinsgrove
Coxey’s Army – 814 N. Market St. (old US 11 & 15), Selinsgrove
Penns Creek Massacre – SR 2017 (old US 11 & 15) just N of Selinsgrove
Penns Creek Massacre (Plaque) – S end Old Trail (just E of US 11 & 15), Penns Creek N of Selinsgrove
Schoch Blockhouse – US 522 at Kreamer
Susquehanna University – US 522, .5 mile W of old US 11 & 15, Selinsgrove
Albany Purchase – US 522 (old US 11 & 15) 1 mile N of Selinsgrove
Harris Ambush (Plaque) –  At the Old Bridge, 1/2 mile W of Selinsgrove
Sunbury – U.S. 11 & 15, 4 miles N of Selinsgrove
Shikellamy – US 11, 5.4 miles N of Selinsgrove entrance to Shikellamy State Park
Snyder County – County courthouse, 9 W. Market St. (US 522), Middleburg

See also
National Register of Historic Places listings in Snyder County, Pennsylvania

References

External links

 Snyder County official website 

 
1855 establishments in Pennsylvania
Counties of Appalachia